Deuripara is a locality in Bongaigaon, surrounded by localities of Paglasthan, Hatimura and New Bongaigaon with nearest railway station, New Bongaigaon railway station at New Bongaigaon.

District Judicial
District Judicial of Bongaigaon is located in this place.

See also
 Paglasthan
 Borpara, Bongaigaon
 Chapaguri, Bongaigaon
 Dhaligaon
 New Bongaigaon
 Mahabeersthan
 Dolaigaon
 BOC Gate, Bongaigaon

References

Neighbourhoods in Bongaigaon